The Council of the European Union, often referred to in the treaties and other official documents simply as the Council, and informally known as the Council of Ministers, is the third of the seven Institutions of the European Union (EU) as listed in the Treaty on European Union. It is one of two legislative bodies and together with the European Parliament serves to amend and approve or veto the proposals of the European Commission, which holds the right of initiative.

The Council of the European Union and the European Council are the only EU institutions that are explicitly intergovernmental, that is, forums whose attendees express and represent the position of their Member State's executive, be they ambassadors, ministers or heads of state/government.

The Council meets in 10 different configurations of  national ministers (one per state). The precise membership of these configurations varies according to the topic under consideration; for example, when discussing agricultural policy the Council is formed by the  national ministers whose portfolio includes this policy area (with the related European Commissioners contributing but not voting).

Composition 
The Presidency of the Council rotates every six months among the governments of EU member states, with the relevant ministers of the respective country holding the Presidency at any given time ensuring the smooth running of the meetings and setting the daily agenda. The continuity between presidencies is provided by an arrangement under which three successive presidencies, known as Presidency trios, share common political programmes. The Foreign Affairs Council (national foreign ministers) is however chaired by the Union's High Representative.

Its decisions are made by qualified majority voting in most areas, unanimity in others, or just simple majority for procedural issues. Usually where it operates unanimously, it only needs to consult the Parliament. However, in most areas the ordinary legislative procedure applies meaning both Council and Parliament share legislative and budgetary powers equally, meaning both have to agree for a proposal to pass. In a few limited areas the Council may initiate new EU law itself.

The General Secretariat of the Council of the European Union, also known as Council Secretariat, assists the Council of the European Union, the Presidency of the Council of the European Union, the European Council and the President of the European Council. The Secretariat is headed by the Secretary-General of the Council of the European Union. The Secretariat is divided into seven directorates-general, each administered by a director-general.

History 

The Council first appeared in the European Coal and Steel Community (ECSC) as the "Special Council of Ministers", set up to counterbalance the High Authority (the supranational executive, now the Commission). The original Council had limited powers: issues relating only to coal and steel were in the Authority's domain, and the Council's consent was only required on decisions outside coal and steel. As a whole, the Council only scrutinised the High Authority (the executive). In 1957, the Treaties of Rome established two new communities, and with them two new Councils: the Council of the European Atomic Energy Community (EAEC) and the Council of the European Economic Community (EEC). However, due to objections over the supranational power of the Authority, their Councils had more powers; the new executive bodies were known as "Commissions".

In 1965, the Council was hit by the "empty chair crisis". Due to disagreements between French President Charles de Gaulle and the Commission's agriculture proposals, among other things, France boycotted all meetings of the Council. This halted the Council's work until the impasse was resolved the following year by the Luxembourg compromise. Although initiated by a gamble of the President of the Commission, Walter Hallstein, who later on lost the Presidency, the crisis exposed flaws in the Council's workings.

Under the Merger Treaty of 1967, the ECSC's Special Council of Ministers and the Council of the EAEC (together with their other independent institutions) were merged into the Council of the European Communities, which would act as a single Council for all three institutions. In 1993, the Council adopted the name 'Council of the European Union', following the establishment of the European Union by the Maastricht Treaty. That treaty strengthened the Council, with the addition of more intergovernmental elements in the three pillars system. However, at the same time the Parliament and Commission had been strengthened inside the Community pillar, curtailing the ability of the Council to act independently.

The Treaty of Lisbon abolished the pillar system and gave further powers to Parliament. It also merged the Council's High Representative with the Commission's foreign policy head, with this new figure chairing the foreign affairs Council rather than the rotating presidency. The European Council was declared a separate institution from the Council, also chaired by a permanent president, and the different Council configurations were mentioned in the treaties for the first time.

The development of the Council has been characterised by the rise in power of the Parliament, with which the Council has had to share its legislative powers. The Parliament has often provided opposition to the Council's wishes. This has in some cases led to clashes between both bodies with the Council's system of intergovernmentalism contradicting the developing parliamentary system and supranational principles.

Powers and functions 
The primary purpose of the Council is to act as one of two vetoing bodies of the EU's legislative branch, the other being the European Parliament. Together they serve to amend, approve or disapprove the proposals of the European Commission, which has the sole power to propose laws. Jointly with the Parliament, the Council holds the budgetary power of the Union and has greater control than the Parliament over the more intergovernmental areas of the EU, such as foreign policy and macroeconomic co-ordination. Finally, before the entry into force of the Treaty of Lisbon, it formally held the executive power of the EU which it conferred upon the European Commission. It is considered by some to be equivalent to  an upper house of the EU legislature, although it's not described as such in the treaties. The Council represents the executive governments of the EU's member states and is based in the Europa building in Brussels.

Legislative procedure 

The EU's legislative authority is divided between the Council, the Parliament and the Commission. As the relationships and powers of these institutions have developed, various legislative procedures have been created for adopting laws. In early times, the avis facultatif maxim was: "The Commission proposes, and the Council disposes"; but now the vast majority of laws are now subject to the ordinary legislative procedure, which works on the principle that consent from both the Council and Parliament are required before a law may be adopted.

Under this procedure, the Commission presents a proposal to Parliament and the Council. Following its first reading the Parliament may propose amendments. If the Council accepts these amendments then the legislation is approved. If it does not then it adopts a "common position" and submits that new version to the Parliament. At its second reading, if the Parliament approves the text or does not act, the text is adopted, otherwise the Parliament may propose further amendments to the Council's proposal. It may be rejected out right by an absolute majority of MEPs. If the Council still does not approve the Parliament's position, then the text is taken to a "Conciliation Committee" composed of the Council members plus an equal number of MEPs. If a Committee manages to adopt a joint text, it then has to be approved in a third reading by both the Council and Parliament or the proposal is abandoned.

The few other areas that operate the special legislative procedures are justice & home affairs, budget and taxation and certain aspects of other policy areas: such as the fiscal aspects of environmental policy. In these areas, the Council or Parliament decide law alone. The procedure used also depends upon which type of institutional act is being used. The strongest act is a regulation, an act or law which is directly applicable in its entirety. Then there are directives which bind members to certain goals which they must achieve, but they do this through their own laws and hence have room to manoeuvre in deciding upon them. A decision is an instrument which is focused at a particular person or group and is directly applicable. Institutions may also issue recommendations and opinions which are merely non-binding declarations.

The Council votes in one of three ways; unanimity, simple majority, or qualified majority. In most cases, the Council votes on issues by qualified majority voting, meaning that there must be a minimum of 55% of member states agreeing (at least 15) who together represent at least 65% of the EU population. A 'blocking minority' can only be formed by at least 4 member states representing at least 35% of the EU population.

Resolutions
Council resolutions have no legal effect. Usually the Council's intention is to set out future work foreseen in a specific policy area or to invite action by the Commission. If a resolution covers a policy area which is not entirely within an area of EU competency, the resolution will be issued as a "resolution of the Council and the representatives of the governments of the member states". Examples are the Council Resolution of 26 September 1989 on the development of subcontracting in the Community and the Council Resolution of 26 November 2001 on consumer credit and indebtedness.

Foreign affairs 

The legal instruments used by the Council for the Common Foreign and Security Policy are different from the legislative acts. Under the CFSP they consist of "common positions", "joint actions", and "common strategies". Common positions relate to defining a European foreign policy towards a particular third-country such as the promotion of human rights and democracy in Myanmar, a region such as the stabilisation efforts in the African Great Lakes, or a certain issue such as support for the International Criminal Court. A common position, once agreed, is binding on all EU states who must follow and defend the policy, which is regularly revised. A joint action refers to a co-ordinated action of the states to deploy resources to achieve an objective, for example for mine clearing or to combat the spread of small arms. Common strategies defined an objective and commits the EUs resources to that task for four years.

Budgetary authority 
The legislative branch officially holds the Union's budgetary authority. The EU's budget (which is around 155 billion euro) is subject to a form of the ordinary legislative procedure with a single reading giving Parliament power over the entire budget (prior to 2009, its influence was limited to certain areas) on an equal footing with the Council. If there is a disagreement between them, it is taken to a conciliation committee as it is for legislative proposals. But if the joint conciliation text is not approved, the Parliament may adopt the budget definitively. In addition to the budget, the Council coordinates the economic policy of members.

Organisation 
The Council's rules of procedure contain the provisions necessary for its organisation and functioning.

Presidency 

The Presidency of the Council is not a single post, but is held by a member state's government. Every six months the presidency rotates among the states, in an order predefined by the Council's members, allowing each state to preside over the body. From 2007, every three member states co-operate for their combined eighteen months on a common agenda, although only one formally holds the presidency for the normal six-month period. For example, the President for the second half of 2007, Portugal, was the second in a trio of states alongside Germany and Slovenia with whom Portugal had been co-operating. The Council meets in various configurations (as outlined below) so its membership changes depending upon the issue. The person chairing the Council will always be the member from the state holding the Presidency. A delegate from the following Presidency also assists the presiding member and may take over work if requested. The exception however is the foreign affairs council, which has been chaired by the High Representative since the entry into force of the Lisbon Treaty.

The role of the Presidency is administrative and political. On the administrative side it is responsible for procedures and organising the work of the Council during its term. This includes summoning the Council for meetings along with directing the work of COREPER and other committees and working groups. The political element is the role of successfully dealing with issues and mediating in the Council. In particular this includes setting the agenda of the council, hence giving the Presidency substantial influence in the work of the Council during its term. The Presidency also plays a major role in representing the Council within the EU and representing the EU internationally, for example at the United Nations.

Configurations 
Legally speaking, the Council is a single entity (this means that technically any Council configuration can adopt decisions that fall within the remit of any other Council configuration) but it is in practice divided into several different council configurations (or ‘(con)formations’). Article 16(6) of the Treaty on European Union provides:

Each council configuration deals with a different functional area, for example agriculture and fisheries. In this formation, the council is composed of ministers from each state government who are responsible for this area: the agriculture and fisheries ministers. The chair of this council is held by the member from the state holding the presidency (see section above). Similarly, the Economic and Financial Affairs Council is composed of national finance ministers, and they are still one per state and the chair is held by the member coming from the presiding country. The Councils meet irregularly throughout the year except for the three major configurations (top three below) which meet once a month. , there are ten formations:
General Affairs (GAC) General affairs co-ordinates the work of the Council, prepares for European Council meetings and deals with issues crossing various council formations.
Foreign Affairs (FAC) Chaired by the High Representative, rather than the Presidency, it manages the CFSP, CSDP, trade and development co-operation. It sometimes meets in a defence configuration.

Economic and Financial Affairs (Ecofin) Composed of economics and finance ministers of the member states. It includes budgetary and eurozone matters via an informal group composed only of eurozone member ministers.
Agriculture and Fisheries (Agrifish) Composed of the agriculture and fisheries ministers of the member states. It considers matters concerning the Common Agricultural Policy, the Common Fisheries Policy, forestry, organic farming, food and feed safety, seeds, pesticides, and fisheries.
Justice and Home Affairs (JHA) This configuration brings together Justice ministers and Interior Ministers of the Member States. Includes civil protection.
Employment, Social Policy, Health and Consumer Affairs (EPSCO) Composed of employment, social protection, consumer protection, health and equal opportunities ministers.
Competitiveness (COMPET) Created in June 2002 through the merging of three previous configurations (Internal Market, Industry and Research). Depending on the items on the agenda, this formation is composed of ministers responsible for areas such as European affairs, industry, tourism and scientific research. With the entry into force of the Lisbon Treaty, the EU acquired competence in space matters, and space policy has been attributed to the Competitiveness Council.
Transport, Telecommunications and Energy (TTE) Created in June 2002, through the merging of three policies under one configuration, and with a composition varying according to the specific items on its agenda. This formation meets approximately once every two months.
Environment (ENV) Composed of environment ministers, who meet about four times a year.
Education, Youth, Culture and Sport (EYC) Composed of education, culture, youth, communications and sport ministers, who meet around three or four times a year. Includes audiovisual issues.

Complementing these, the Political and Security Committee (PSC) brings together ambassadors to monitor international situations and define policies within the CSDP, particularly in crises. The European Council is similar to a configuration of the Council and operates in a similar way, but is composed of the national leaders (heads of government or state) and has its own President, since 2019, Charles Michel. The body's purpose is to define the general "impetus" of the Union. The European Council deals with the major issues such as the appointment of the President of the European Commission who takes part in the body's meetings.

Ecofin's Eurozone component, the Euro group, is also a formal group with its own President. Its European Council counterpart is the Euro summit formalized in 2011 and the TSCG.

Following the entry into force of a framework agreement between the EU and ESA there is a Space Council configuration—a joint and concomitant meeting of the EU Council and of the ESA Council at ministerial level dealing with the implementation of the ESP adopted by both organisations.

Administration 

The General Secretariat of the Council provides the continuous infrastructure of the Council, carrying out preparation for meetings, draft reports, translation, records, documents, agendas and assisting the presidency. The Secretary General of the Council is head of the Secretariat. The Secretariat is divided into seven directorates-general, each administered by a director-general.

The Committee of Permanent Representatives (COREPER) is a body composed of representatives from the states (ambassadors, civil servants etc.) who meet each week to prepare the work and tasks of the Council. It monitors and co-ordinates work and deals with the Parliament on co-decision legislation. It is divided into two groups of the representatives (Coreper II) and their deputies (Coreper I). Agriculture is dealt with separately by the Special Committee on Agriculture (SCA). The numerous working groups submit their reports to the Council through Coreper or SCA.

Governments represented in the Council

The Treaty of Lisbon mandated a change in voting system from 1 November 2014 for most cases to double majority Qualified Majority Voting, replacing the voting weights system. Decisions made by the council have to be taken by 55% of member states representing at least 65% of the EU's population.

Almost all members of the Council are members of a political party at national level, and most of these are members of a European-level political party. However the Council is composed to represent the Member States rather than political parties and the nature of coalition governments in a number of states means that party breakdown at different configuration of the Council vary depending on which domestic party was assigned the portfolio. However, the broad ideological alignment of the government in each state does influence the nature of the law the Council produces and the extent to which the link between domestic parties puts pressure on the members in the European Parliament to vote a certain way.

Location 

By a decision of the European Council at Edinburgh in December 1992, the Council has its seat in Brussels but in April, June, and October, it holds its meetings in Luxembourg City. Between 1952 and 1967, the ECSC Council held its Luxembourg City meetings in the Cercle Municipal on Place d’Armes. Its secretariat moved on numerous occasions but between 1955 and 1967 it was housed in the Verlorenkost district of the city. In 1957, with the creation of two new Communities with their own Councils, discretion on location was given to the current Presidency. In practice this was to be in the Château of Val-Duchesse until the autumn of 1958, at which point it moved to 2 Rue Ravensteinstraat in Brussels.

The 1965 agreement (finalised by the Edinburgh agreement and annexed to the treaties) on the location of the newly merged institutions, the Council was to be in Brussels but would meet in Luxembourg City during April, June, and October. The ECSC secretariat moved from Luxembourg City to the merged body Council secretariat in the Ravenstein building of Brussels. In 1971 the Council and its secretariat moved into the Charlemagne building, next to the Commission's Berlaymont, but the Council rapidly ran out of space and administrative branch of the Secretariat moved to a building at 76 Rue Joseph II/Jozef II-straat and during the 1980s the language divisions moved out into the Nerviens, Frère Orban, and Guimard buildings.

In 1995, the Council moved into the Justus Lipsius building, across the road from Charlemagne. However, its staff was still increasing, so it continued to rent the Frère Orban building to house the Finnish and Swedish language divisions. Staff continued to increase and the Council rented, in addition to owning Justus Lipsius, the Kortenberg, Froissart, Espace Rolin, and Woluwe Heights buildings. Since acquiring the Lex building in 2008, the three aforementioned buildings are no longer in use by the Council services.

When the Council is meeting in Luxembourg City, it meets in the Kirchberg Conference Centre, and its offices are based at the European Centre on the plateau du Kirchberg. The Council has also met occasionally in Strasbourg, in various other cities, and also outside the Union: for example in 1974 when it met in Tokyo and Washington, D. C. while trade and energy talks were taking place. Under the Council's present rules of procedures the Council can, in extraordinary circumstances, hold one of its meetings outside Brussels and Luxembourg.

From 2017, both the Council of the European Union and the European Council adopted the purpose built Europa building as their official headquarters, although they continue to utilise the facilities afforded by the adjacent Justus Lipsius building. The focal point of the new building, the distinctive multi-storey "lantern" shaped structure in which the main meeting room is located, is utilised in both EU institutions' new official logos.

See also 
 Comparisons with other institutions

Notes

References

External links 

 Official Council website – Europa
 About the Council
 Council configurations
 Live broadcast
 PRADO – The Council of the European Union Public Register of Authentic Travel and ID Documents Online
 Access to documents of the EU Council on EUR-Lex
 Council of the European Union – European NAvigator
 Archival material concerning the Council of the European Union can be consulted at the Historical Archives of the European Union in Florence

 
Institutions of the European Union
Supranational legislatures
Organisations based in Brussels
Politics of the European Union
Intergovernmental organizations
International organisations based in Belgium